Swallows and Amazons is a 2016 British family adventure film directed by Philippa Lowthorpe and written by Andrea Gibb, based on Arthur Ransome's 1930 children's novel of the same name. The film stars Andrew Scott, Rafe Spall, Kelly Macdonald, Jessica Hynes, and Harry Enfield. Principal photography began on 21 June 2015 in the Lake District. The film, which was released on 19 August 2016, is the third audiovisual adaption of the novel; the first being a 6-part BBC TV series in 1963 and the second a 1974 film version.

Synopsis
The film is based on Ransome's book, but the script incorporates many changes to the plot. It chronicles the story of the Walker children on their holiday in the Lake District in the summer of 1935. They want to camp on an island in the lake. When they get there in the boat Swallow, they soon discover they are not alone. Two other children, the Blacketts, also known as the "Amazons", have set up camp there, and a battle for the island begins. But with Britain on the brink of war and a "secret agent" looking for the Blackett children's uncle, they have a series of adventures quite different from their plans.

Cast
 Rafe Spall as Jim Turner / "Captain Flint", the uncle of the Blackett children
 Andrew Scott as Lazlow, a "secret agent" looking for Jim Turner
 Kelly Macdonald as Mrs Walker, the mother of the Walker children
 Jessica Hynes as Mrs Jackson, the wife of Mr Jackson
 Harry Enfield as Mr Jackson
 Fenella Woolgar as Miss Crummock
 Dane Hughes as John Walker
 Orla Hill as Susan Walker
 Teddie-Rose Malleson-Allen as Tatty Walker
 Bobby McCulloch as Roger Walker
 Seren Hawkes as Nancy Blackett
 Hannah Jayne Thorp as Peggy Blackett

Production
Principal photography on the film began on 21 June 2015 in the Lake District, North West England. The film was also shot in Yorkshire, at Plumpton Rocks parkland near Harrogate (the location for 'Wild Cat Island'). Other Yorkshire locations include Heptonstall near Hebden Bridge, Oakworth Station on the Keighley and Worth Valley Railway, and Stockeld Park, all in West Yorkshire.

Arts correspondent for The Daily Telegraph, Hannah Furness, observed, "The original Swallows and Amazons saw its intrepid children battling the perilous waters of the Lake District summer, a grumpy uncle and, occasionally, one another. The 2016 update, a BBC film of the same name, will add one further foe to that list: gun-toting Russian spies in their midst. The tweaks to the film were inspired by the real life of author Arthur Ransome, who is now known to have been an MI6 spy. At one point, papers in the National Archive reveal, he was under suspicion of being a double agent for Russia. The film plot will use his story as the inspiration for the character of Jim Turner, always thought to have been partially based on the writer himself."

The music was composed by Ilan Eshkeri.

Critical reception
On Rotten Tomatoes the film received a rating of 94%, based on 32 reviews, with an average rating of 6.7/10. On Metacritic the film received a score of 65 out of 100, based on 9 critics, indicating "generally favorable reviews".

Writing in The Daily Telegraph, Lewis Jones noted that Arthur Ransome had written in his diary "Saw the ghastly mess they have made of poor old Swallows and Amazons" after watching the BBC's 1962 series. Jones added, "I think he might have liked Philippa Lowthorpe's forthcoming film, though, which is true to the spirit of his book, and so attentive to period detail that at one point Mrs Walker smokes a cigarette". Jones outlined the film's changes to the book's character Jim Turner, writing: "In the film he is engaged in espionage and pursued by Russian agents, which gives the story some grown-up oomph, and pays fitting tribute to the author's wildly adventurous early life. For Ransome was not merely a boaty old buffer with a walrus moustache who wrote children's books. As a young journalist he reported on the Russian Revolution, was on intimate terms with its leaders and was himself an active player, which led to his recruitment by MI6."

For Alistair Harkness, writing in The Scotsman, the film "serves as a gentle reminder of the value of allowing children to get outside and explore instead of being mollycoddled by fearful parents". He added: "The film adds an espionage subplot that feels a little underpowered to really provide the intended narrative oomph, danger or excitement, but in an age in which the teen heroes and heroines of YA adaptations are routinely given ridiculously proficient combat skills, there's something nice about watching kids mucking about and learning basic wilderness skills."

Geoffrey Macnab in The Independent began by saying: "This new adaptation of Arthur Ransome's novel evokes a long-lost era in which kids didn't just spend their days searching for Pokémon or playing Call Of Duty. Instead, they had rip-roaring adventures in sailing boats and camped on remote islands." He found the "loving Hovis-ad fashion, complete with tweed caps, cardigans and idyllic villages that always seem to be full of bunting" of the filming to be evocative but was less impressed that "[f]or no apparent reason, the filmmakers have grafted on a John Buchan/Alfred Hitchcock-style spy story to proceedings". Macnab concluded, "The film is at its best when the adults are kept at bay. [It] really takes wing […] when the Swallows and Amazons are trying to steal each other's boats, making expeditions by moonlight or are planning just what they're going to eat after dropping their provisions in the lake."

Trevor Johnston in the Radio Times opined: "For today's children, this fresh adaptation of Arthur Ransome's classic Lake District tale must seem as if it's taking place on some distant planet. The brothers and sisters here are allowed to take their dinghy to the waters by themselves and even stay overnight on the island at its middle. They gut fish for dinner, navigate their way round the shores, and even find themselves in a territorial dispute with some cunning local rivals. Not a smartphone or tablet in sight, no social media updates, and no sign of an app to light a campfire when the matches have gone astray." He too remarked on the changes to the plot, deciding: "With more at stake, the drama is intensified, as director Philippa Lowthorpe […] gives everything hands-on credibility while still retaining the nostalgic appeal of bygone days [and] also works brilliantly with the junior cast."  Johnston concluded that "All in all, it's an intelligent, involving, beautifully mounted adaptation of material that might easily have seemed an old-fashioned relic. And the grey, blustery Lake District weather could hardly be more British."

References

External links
  
 
 
 
 
 
  

2016 films
2010s adventure drama films
British adventure drama films
British children's adventure films
Films based on British novels
Films scored by Ilan Eshkeri
Films set in the 1930s
Films set in 1935
Films set in the Lake District
Films set on islands
Film
2010s children's adventure films
2016 directorial debut films
2016 drama films
2010s English-language films
Films directed by Philippa Lowthorpe
2010s British films